Keith Graham Branagan (born 10 July 1966) is a football coach and former professional player.

As a player, he was a goalkeeper who notably played in the Premier League for Bolton Wanderers and Ipswich Town. He also played in the Football League for Cambridge United, Millwall, Brentford and Gillingham. Born in England, he won a single cap for the Republic of Ireland at international level in 1997.

Club career
Branagan played for a number of clubs in his career. He began his career at Cambridge United, and later joined Millwall. However, his most successful years were spent at Bolton Wanderers, where he experienced three promotions, played two seasons in the Premier League and played at Wembley in the 1995 League Cup final. After eight years at Bolton, Branagan joined Ipswich Town in 2000.

He was forced to retire from the game in October 2002 following a nine-month battle against a shoulder injury. Branagan has remained in the game following retirement; he now has a UEFA 'A' Coaching licence and has coached the goalkeepers at Crewe Alexandra and Stockport County before taking up a coaching role at Bolton School. He is still there as a football coach.

International career
At international level, Branagan won one full cap for the Republic of Ireland. His only senior cap came on 11 February 1997, in the 0–0 draw against Wales at The National Stadium, Cardiff. Branagan also played a couple of matches for the Republic of Ireland "B" team.

Coaching career
He become a part-time youth goalkeeping coach for Bolton Wanderers on 28 March 2012.

Personal life
His son Ritchie Branagan is also a goalkeeper and has played professionally for Bury and Macclesfield Town.

Since 2004, Branagan has worked as the director of football coaching at Bolton School.

Honours
Bolton Wanderers
Football League Cup runner-up: 1994–95
 First Division: 1996–97

Ipswich Town
Football League First Division play-offs: 2000

See also
 List of Republic of Ireland international footballers born outside the Republic of Ireland

References

External links
 

1966 births
Living people
Republic of Ireland association footballers
Republic of Ireland international footballers
Republic of Ireland B international footballers
Bolton Wanderers F.C. players
Millwall F.C. players
Ipswich Town F.C. players
Cambridge United F.C. players
Brentford F.C. players
Gillingham F.C. players
Association football goalkeepers
Premier League players
English Football League players
Bolton Wanderers F.C. non-playing staff
Footballers from Fulham
Association football goalkeeping coaches